The Scattering of Ashes is the fourth full-length studio album by the Canadian heavy metal band Into Eternity. It was released on 3 October 2006 by Century Media Records.

It is the first album to feature vocalist Stu Block, and bassist Troy Bleich. In addition, the cover art is the first since their eponymous debut that does not feature the crow prominently depicted on previous albums.

To date, the album has sold over 15,000 copies in the US, and peaked at number 45 on Billboard's Top Independent Albums chart.

Two videos were made for "Severe Emotional Distress", and "Timeless Winter."

Track listing
 All songs written and arranged by Into Eternity except for "Severe Emotional Distress" by Into Eternity and Rob Doherty
 All lyrics by Tim Roth and Stu Block except for "Surrounded By Night" by Tim Roth, Stu Block and Rob Doherty
 All songs 2006 Magic Arts Publishing

Personnel
Credits are adapted from the album's liner notes. 

Into Eternity
 Tim Roth − clean/death vocals & guitar
 Troy Bleich − bass & clean/death vocals
 Stu Block − clean/death vocals
 Jim Austin − drums

Additional musicians
 Collin Craig − 1st guitar solo on "Nothing"

Production and other
 Produced and engineered by Grant Hall and Johnny "Six Pack" Gasparic
 Mixed by Andy Sneap from June 23 to July 5, 2006
 Artwork, logo and layout by Mattias Norén. 
 Photography by Cortney Bodnar

References

External links
 The Scattering of Ashes Album Page
 Century Music Audio Studios

2006 albums
Into Eternity (band) albums
Century Media Records albums